Sooraj Thomas better known by his stage name Sooraj Tom is an Indian film director, ad maker, and actor who works predominantly in the Malayalam film industry. He has directed three films, Pa Va (2016), Ente Mezhuthiri Athazhangal (2018) and Krishnankutty Pani Thudangi (2021).

Personal life 
Sooraj completed his schooling from St. Aloysius High School, Athirampuzha, Kottayam. He graduated from KE Collage Mannanam, Kottayam, he also holds a Diploma in Multimedia.

Career 
Sooraj started his career in 2005 as an actor and assistant director with the Mammootty starrer Malayalam-language film Bombay March 12. His debut directional venture was Pa Va (2016) featuring Anoop Menon, Murali Gopi and Prayaga Martin. Then he directed Ente Mezhuthiri Athazhangal in 2018.

His short film featuring N.M Badusha in lead role named Sarbath(2020) was critically acclaimed and was made in five Indian Languages including Malayalam, Tamil, Kannada, Telugu and Hindi.

Later in 2021, he directed Krishnankutty Pani Thudangi, a mystery thriller movie in Malayalam Language with Vishnu Unnikrishnan and Saniya Iyyappan in lead roles. His latest project is a Malayalam short film named Better Half (2022).

Filmography

As director

As assistant director

As actor

Awards and nominations

References

External links
 

Living people
Date of birth missing (living people)
21st-century Indian film directors
21st-century Indian male actors
Male actors from Kottayam
Year of birth missing (living people)